Gabriel marquis d'Arboussier  (14 January 1908 – 21 December 1976) was a Senegalese-French politician.

Son of the baron Henri d’Arboussier-Monplaisir, a colonial governor (from a wealthy family of farmers) and la princesse Mossi, a Muslim mother, studied in France and began a career as a colonial administrator. D'Arboussier served in the French National Assembly from 1945 until 1946, and from 1946 he was member of Gabon's first constituent assembly under Houphouet-Boigny, a founder of the African Democratic Rally (RDA), where he became secretary general. The same year he was co-opted by his party to be a counselor of the French Union (for Côte d'Ivoire). In 1949, he traveled around the world and made a  journey to the Soviet Union.

A colorful character, cultured and brilliant, Arboussier fell out with Houphouet-Boigny, costing him his mandate in the RDA and the French Union.

He was the first Vice-President and Chairman of the Grand Council of the AOF from March 1958 to January 1959. After the wave of decolonization, he became Minister of Justice in Senegal (1960-1962). He also served as a  Deputy Director of UNESCO from 1963 to 1964 and ambassador to France at the same time,  Deputy Director of the Research Institute of the United Nations (1965-1966) and was Appointed Ambassador to West Germany in 1974.

References
Robert Cornevin, Hommes et destins : dictionnaire biographique d'outre-mer, Académie des sciences d'outre-mer, 1975, p. 8-9 
 1st page on the French National Assembly website 
 2nd page on the French National Assembly website

1908 births
1976 deaths
People from Mopti Region
People of French West Africa
Union progressiste politicians
Rassemblement Démocratique Africain politicians
Justice ministers of Senegal
Members of the Constituent Assembly of France (1945)
Ambassadors of Senegal to West Germany
Ambassadors of Senegal to France